Brassic is a British comedy-drama television series which premiered on Sky One on 22 August 2019 and became Sky's most successful comedy in seven years. The series follows the lives of Vinnie O'Neill (Joe Gilgun) and his friends in the fictional town of Hawley. The first series consists of six episodes, which concluded on 19 September 2019, receiving positive reviews. Other primary cast members include Michelle Keegan, Damien Molony, Tom Hanson, Aaron Heffernan, Ryan Sampson, Parth Thakerar and Dominic West.

Before the first episode had even aired, it was announced that Brassic had been renewed for a second series, which premiered on 7 May 2020. The show was renewed for an expanded third series of eight episodes; which premiered on 6 October 2021 on Sky Max. In August 2021, prior to the airing of the third series, a fourth began filming and premiered on 7 September 2022. In August 2022, the series was renewed for a fifth series, and started filming that month to premiere in 2023.

The title Brassic is the colloquial pronunciation of Boracic as in Boracic lint, a medical dressing, the name of which is Cockney rhyming slang for skint (i.e. insolvent).

Plot
Brassic follows the lives of Vinnie O'Neill and his five friends as they live their lives in the fictional northern English town of Hawley. The working class group commit various crimes to keep money in their pockets, but as they get older some of them start to wonder if there's more to life away from the town.

Cast and characters

Main
 Joe Gilgun as Vincent "Vinnie" O'Neill
A disturbed man, Vince struggles with bipolar disorder and is plagued by his miserable childhood. His mother left when he was young and his alcoholic, safe-blower father raised him the best he could. Vinnie blew his first safe when he was seven years old and has been committing various criminal acts to survive ever since. He lives alone in a shack in the woods on the outskirts of Hawley. The combination of rural solitude and his firm friendship with Dylan and Erin, helps Vinnie cope with life. He is quick-witted, confident with an eccentric intensity and has a great depth of compassion towards others. He regularly visits his general practitioner, Dr. Chris Cox, who doesn't exactly provide him with the help he is looking for. Zack Pierce portrays a young Vinnie in a recurring role.
 Damien Molony as Dylan
Vinnie's best friend and Erin's boyfriend who is knowledgeable and skillful at poker. He is in love with Erin and has a close relationship with her son, Tyler. Vinnie is like a brother to Dylan and the one person that truly understands him. Dylan passed up a chance to go to university, as he didn't want to abandon his friends, and, to Erin's frustration, has never matured. He occasionally works at Kath's pub but spends most of his time slacking off.
 Michelle Keegan as Erin Croft
Open-minded, fiery, and attractive, her unhappy childhood led to a wild child phase in her teenage years that left her alone and pregnant at a young age. However, having her son, Tyler, turned out to be a blessing. Determined to give him all the chances she never had, Erin is studying at college so she can get out of town and start a better life. Erin's boyfriend is Dylan, who she loves, but he struggles to offer her the stability she needs or the future she craves for herself and Tyler. Whilst she has a soft spot for Vinnie, she is aware that his presence is holding her back from her long-term plans.
 Tom Hanson as Leslie "Cardi" Titt
The "nice guy", who the group affectionately calls "Cardi" (short for cardiac arrest) due to his obesity and unhealthy diet. He is from a big estate family and when his parents kicked him out, he moved into a flat above a kebab shop. Cardi is insecure and body-conscious and has been bullied about his weight and stuttering. Cardi met the group through Ash who protected him from a gang of mocking teenagers. His role in the group is that of a runner: fetching gear, and dropping things off. He feels most at home in the kebab shop where he is something of a local hero and celebrated winner of every kebab eating contest. Cardi's other passion is for his pet pigeon Nigel.
 Aaron Heffernan as Ashley "Ash" Dennings
Growing up on a traveller site on the outskirts of Hawley he comes from a proud fighting family and, raised by his strict mother, he can switch to extreme violence in seconds, which makes him handy to have around as the muscle in the gang. While Ash is openly gay to the group, he chooses to hide his true sexuality from his family. The boys know his struggles and Ash and Vinnie have boxed together for years. He finds solace in having mates who accept him completely and it is with the lads that he feels most comfortable.
 Parth Thakerar as Jehan "JJ" Jovani
From a small British Asian family, JJ's older brothers went into medicine and law but JJ takes after his father who is the black sheep of the family. After a failed attempt at college, going to purely impress his mother, JJ set up his own motor workshop in Hawley. To keep the more legitimate side of his business afloat, he relies on Vinnie to bring him dubiously acquired cars. He chops them up and sells them on for parts and spares. JJ is happy to partake in dodgy dealing and his place in the gang is cemented as the fixer and technician of the group.
 Ryan Sampson as Tommo
A loner but very content with his lifestyle, Tommo has no family and is happiest when he is taking part in various sexual activities. Turning his passion into a business, he makes money holding secret S&M nights for rich local businessmen, barristers, and brigadiers. Tommo is a free spirit: he does what he wants, when he wants, and is the one in the gang who never cares what people think, making hkim unpredictale. 
 Steve Evets as Farmer Jim
A local farmer near Hawley who allows Vinnie to grow his cannabis plants in an underground bunker at his farm and helps the gang with many of their escapades.
 Dominic West as Dr. Chris Coxley
Vinnie's general practitioner who he ends up developing a close bond with. In reality, he does not offer Vinnie any constructive advice though the pair agree to help mentor each other, as Chris also reveals his obsession with other people's knees.
 Anthony Welsh as Jake (series 1–2)
A classmate of Erin's at college, he shows an interest in her, despite her ongoing relationship and son. After initially getting close to Erin he later starts a relationship after she splits with Dylan. However, this ends after his brother Aaron makes sexual advances toward her and subsequently assaults her.
 Ruth Sheen as Kath (series 1)
The pub landlady of "The Crows Nest" that the group frequents. She is very sociable, having known them all for years, and is aware of everyone's issues.
 Ramon Tikaram as Terence McCann (series 2–3; guest series 1)
A local career criminal and businessman who Vinnie steals from. He threatens to castrate Vinnie if he does not repay him the value of the stolen goods, which results in Vinnie faking his own death. McCann later decides to forgive Vinnie but forces him to work various jobs, surprisingly satisfied with Vinnie's abilities despite frequent runs with his goons. After eventually kidnapping Tyler to force Vinnie and Erin to finally repay him, he is finally exposed for his criminal nature and arrested. He acts as the main antagonist for the first three series.
 Bronagh Gallagher as Carol Dennings (series 2–present; guest series 1)
Ash's older sister who shows an interest in Cardi, which leads to a relationship and eventually marriage.
 Tadhg Murphy as Gary (series 3–present; guest series 1–2)
The local Hawley undertaker who has an artificial eye and collects unique body parts from corpses.
 India Mullen as Samantha (series 3)
A barmaid who becomes close with Vinnie. She is later revealed to be an undercover police officer, working with Carl to bring Vinnie and his friends to justice. 
 Joanna Higson as Sugar (series 4; recurring series 2–3; guest series 1)
A stripper and Erin's best friend, who ends up managing the club with her, known as "The Rat and Cutter".

Recurring
 Jude Riordan as Tyler Croft (series 1–3; guest series 4)
Erin and Vinnie's son, who was conceived after a drunken one-night stand. Erin refers to him as "not exactly planned but the best mistake". He is close to Dylan and later has a father-son relationship with Vinnie after learning he's his biological father.
 Tim Dantay as Vinnie's Dad (series 1–2; guest series 4)
Vinnie's unnamed alcoholic father who was not the perfect father to Vinnie during his childhood but did the best he could. He considered suicide after splitting with his girlfriend, devastating Vinnie, who in turn sent him to rehab, which he later escaped from.
 Neil Fitzmaurice as Mr. Bishop (series 1; guest series 2–4)
One of Tommo's clients who often clashes with his ex-wife, who both hire the gang to sabotage each other.
 Archie Kelly as Shirley Paslowski (series 2, 4; guest series 1, 3)
A Polish farmer and Jim's neighbour who is commonly referred to as "Goldilocks" for his long blonde hair. He has frequent run-ins with Jim, often attempting to either sabotage or take over his illegal dealings.
 Claude Scott-Mitchell as Sara (series 2)
Dylan's girlfriend after he ends his relationship with Erin. He later breaks up with her after eventually reuniting with Erin.
 Oliver Wellington as Aaron (series 2)
Jake's brother who takes an unhealthy interest in Erin. He makes sexual advances toward her though she shows no interest in him and later assaults her, resulting in Vinnie viciously beating him.
 John Weaver as Carl Slater (series 3; guest series 1–2)
A police officer, and later Detective Inspector, who is Vinnie's arch-enemy since their childhood and is obsessed with exposing his criminal activities.
 Steve Garti as Chinese Dan (series 3; guest series 2, 4)
A criminal fence who buys or sells stolen goods to the gang.
 Chris Lew Kum Hoi as Hoskins (series 3)
A detective who works with Carl during his investigation of Vinnie and the gang.
 Amit Dhut as Calvin (series 4; guest series 2–3)
Dan's enforcer who helps him buy and sell stolen goods.
 Neil Ashton as Davey MacDonagh (series 4; guest series 3)
A career criminal who forms a rivalry with Vinnie, hoping to take over his business. Working with his brother, Davey fills the void left by McCann's arrest as Hawley's most dangerous criminal. He acts as the main antagonist for the fourth series.
 Greg Wood as Barry MacDonagh (series 4; guest series 3)
Davey's silent but intimidating brother who works with him against Vinnie and the gang.

Production

Development
Joseph Gilgun and Danny Brocklehurst devised a new comedy television series for Sky One, entitled Brassic, in which Gilgun would portray the lead role whereas Brocklehurst would write the episodes' stories and scripts. It began broadcasting in the United Kingdom on 22 August 2019, with the first series consisting of six episodes, broadcast on a weekly basis. Prior to the first episode being aired, the programme was automatically recommissioned for a second series, with producers optimistic that it would be critically reviewed in a positive manner. They were correct, with many critics praising the series for its comedic and dramatic tone; the first series ended its run on 19 September.

On 24 April 2020, Sky released the second series' trailer, confirming that it would begin broadcasting on 7 May that year. It was confirmed that it would also broadcast six episodes with all of them becoming available to be streamed through NOW TV from its premiere date, though would officially be broadcast on a weekly basis through Sky. Prior to series 2 commencing its broadcast, Sky recommissioned the series for an expanded third series, consisting of eight episodes; a projected release date was not disclosed.

Casting
After Gilgun was announced as the series lead, Michelle Keegan, Damien Molony, Tom Hanson, Aaron Heffernan, Ryan Sampson and Parth Thakerar joined the cast in fellow main character roles. The characters include Vincent "Vinnie" O'Neill (Gilgun), Erin Croft (Keegan), Dylan (Molony), "Cardi" (Hanson), Ash (Heffernan), Tommo (Sampson) and JJ (Thakerar), whereas Dominic West and Bronagh Gallagher also portrayed assisting roles throughout the series, starring as Doctor Chris Cox and Carol, respectively.

For series 2, Claude Scott-Mitchell joined the cast in the role of Sara, a new romance for Maloney's character. All series 1 cast members reprised their roles, with Cold Feet star John Thomson and Bill Paterson also joining the cast as newcomers. West also reprised his role, now portraying a more regular character.

Filming

The programme is set in the fictional town of Hawley, which is inspired by Gilgun's experience of growing up in Chorley.  Regarding the setting, location manager Jonathan Davies stated, "We were given the scripts and a few of us had a meeting with Joe [Gilgun] to talk through the feel and look of the show and to talk about which direction to go in. It's a very collaborative process to build a world that fits with the story and script. People want to feel like they're being transported into that real world of Brassic."

The first two series of Brassic were filmed in the Lancashire town of Bacup. Filming of the first series began in September 2018, with a fan tweeting, "As if Michelle Keegan is filming in Bacup, love her". The filming location surprised locals, as not many were informed about the programme filming there and who the cast members were, with one local stating, "There were quite a few people including myself watching and it was causing a few traffic problems as people kept stopping. Michelle Keegan was there surrounded by security guards and there was a Mercedes van ready to take her away when she was done". Further filming locations included some scenes being filmed in Bolton, the Crows Nest pub scenes are filmed in The Star and Garter public house near Manchester Piccadilly station whereas the inaugural episode's notable car-chase opening scene was shot in West Yorkshire. Yacht journey was filmed at the sea near Llandudno.

On the day of the programme's premiere, Gilgun revealed that filming for the second series had already begun prior to the first series airing, with them supposedly having a previously confidential agreement with Sky weeks before. Filming continued through the entire autumn of 2019, with all previous filming locations from series 1 continuing, and locations also expanding across the North West of England.

Gilgun revealed in an interview that the cast and crew had caused controversy during filming, when they were "kicked out" of a circus after a single day of filming, which resulted in the crew having to film the remaining scenes in a car park; Gilgun later stated that the circus were unaware of the amount of cast and crew that the production team were going to bring.

Marketing
The first series' trailer was released by Sky One on 13 August 2019, which included minor clips containing comedic scenes from a variety of episodes and confirmed its release date of 22 August; this trailer was continuously shown on all Sky platforms in the days prior to its premiere.

On 24 April 2020, Sky began to screen the second series' trailer, once again briefly showing clips for the new series and confirming its premiere date of 7 May.

Release

Broadcast
Brassic made its television debut in the United Kingdom on 22 August 2019; all episodes were available to be streamed on demand from the premiere date though was broadcast on a weekly basis by Sky One.

Internationally, the programme has been aired in France, from 16 September; Spain, from 24 September through internet streaming; Germany, from 1 January 2020 through internet streaming; Australia from 25 February 2020, Canada, Russia and the United States. In Russia, it is titled as Голяк.

A third series began filming in late 2020 in and around Manchester.

Home media
All episodes are available to be viewed through the Sky Go and Amazon Video apps. The entire boxset is also available on NOW TV and Virgin Media in the United Kingdom. On 31 July 2020 all episodes became available in the U.S. via Hulu.

On 27 August 2019, it was announced that the complete first series would release to DVD on 30 September.

Reception

Critical response
Lucy Mangan of The Guardian, reviewing the series, gave it four out of five stars, saying: "It is a hilarious, warm, brutal melange that works because it has heart without sentimentality and authenticity without strain."

Creator and lead actor Joseph Gilgun has been praised for his performance as Vinnie O'Neill, with review aggregator website Rotten Tomatoes commenting, "Joseph Gilgun is wonderfully expressive as Vinnie, his volatile features continually scrunching together and apart like the top of a drawstring bag."

Accolades

See also
Television in the United Kingdom

References

External links

2019 British television series debuts
2010s British sitcoms
2020s British sitcoms
Bipolar disorder in fiction
English-language television shows
Sky UK original programming
Television shows set in England